Yehuda Barkan (29 March 1945 – 23 October 2020) was an Israeli actor, film producer, film director, and screenwriter. He was noted for his appearance in Israeli comedy cult classics of the 1970s, and for producing and directing candid camera "prank films" in the 1980s.

Biography 
Yehuda Ezekiel Berkowitz (later Barkan) was born in Netanya. His father was born in Poland while his mother was born in Czechoslovakia. His parents spoke Yiddish. He studied at the Bialik and ORT schools in Netanya. During his military service in the IDF, Barkan served in a Combat Engineering Corps unit and  the Northern Command Military band.
From his first marriage, Barkan had four children.

At the beginning of the 2000s, Barkan became a baal teshuva and moved to the religious moshav Beit Gamliel with his family.

In November 2008 Barkan was questioned by the Israeli Tax Authority on suspicion of tax evasion.

Barkan died on October 23, 2020, after contracting COVID-19 during the COVID-19 pandemic in Israel.

Music career
After his military service, Barkan joined the Dizengoff Command Band (להקת פיקוד דיזנגוף), a band  composed of veteran members of military bands who performed songs and skits.

Media and film career 
[[File:מתוך צ'רלי וחצי.jpg|thumb|Barkan in "Charlie and a Half]]
In the early 1970s, Barkan participated in a sketch on the Israeli radio show Hamim VeTaim (חמים וטעים) in which Barkan and his colleagues, Moshe Timor, Shlomo Bar-Aba and others, made live prank calls. This became the inspiration for his later practical joke films.

During the 1970s and 1980s Barkan participated in many Israeli "Bourekas films", among them Lupo!, Lupo in New York, Katz V'Carasso, Charlie Ve'hetzi, Hagiga B'Snuker, Bo Nefotzetz Million and more. Other films he appeared in during that time include Malkat Hakvish (1971) appearing alongside Gila Almagor, Menachem Golan's film Attack at Dawn (1970), and the film adaptation of the novel He Walked Through the Fields (1967) alongside Assi Dayan.

During the 1980s Barkan began to direct and produce films, including the hidden camera film Hayeh Ahaltah Otah (which he directed together with Yigal Shilon), Nipagesh Bachof, Nipagesh Basivuv, Matzlema Bli Busha and Geveret Tiftehi, Ze Ani). Also during the 1980s, Barkan produced and directed comic drama films, most notably the Abba Ganuv film series and the film Neshika Bametzach released in 1990 alongside Michal Yanai.

In 1994, shortly after the start of Israeli commercial television Channel 2 began its broadcasting, Barkan started hosting his own practical jokes show called Lo Dofkim Cheshbon. The show was cancelled shortly after.

In 1999 Barkan participated in two last films: Look into my eyes and Volcano Junction, in which he played small supporting roles.

In 2003 Barkan took part in the documentary film Zehirut Matzlema along with Nurit Geffen and Josie Katz.

In 2004 Barkan appeared in the drama series Ahava BaShalechet along with Lea Koenig.

Barkan enjoyed a career resurgence in the 2010s. He played the part of a grandfather of a young child with autism in the Israeli television series Yellow Peppers, and beginning in 2017 played a rabbi in the television series Kipat Barzel.

Selected filmography
Films
 1967: He Walked Through the Fields
 1970: Lupo! – Lupo
 1971: Katz and Karasso 1971: The Highway Queen (Malkat Hakvish) – Arik
 1972: Escape to the Sun – Yasha Bazarov
 1974: Charlie Ve'hetzi (Charlie and a Half) – Charlie
 1975: Hagiga B'Snuker 1985: Smell and Smile (Kompot Na'alyim)
1987: Cool Dad (Abba Ganuv)
 1987: Nipagesh Basivuv1989: Cool Dad 2 (Abba Ganuv 2)
 1990: Neshika Bametzach (The Day We Met) – Arik Schwartzman
1991: Cool Dad 3 (Abba Ganuv 3)
 1992: Ma'am, Open, It's Me
 1993: Looking for a husband on four legs
 1999: Look me in the eyes
 1999: Vulcan Junction
 2000: Mosh
 2003: Every Jew is Gold
 2013: Matat
 2015: Tobiansky
 2015:  Tales of Tales of Rabbi Nachman
 2019: Love in Shlikes - Beno

Television
 2011: Yellow Peppers 2017: Kipat Barzel''

References

External links

 
 , starring Yehuda Barkan as the king

1945 births
2020 deaths
Israeli Orthodox Jews
Israeli male film actors
Israeli male television actors
People from Netanya
Ashkenazi Jews in Mandatory Palestine
Baalei teshuva
Israeli film directors
Deaths from the COVID-19 pandemic in Israel
Israeli people of Czech-Jewish descent
Israeli people of Polish-Jewish descent